Kakichi (written: 稼吉, 嘉吉 or 佳吉) is a masculine Japanese given name. Notable people with the name include:

, Japanese politician
, Japanese zoologist
, Japanese politician and Governor-General of Taiwan

Japanese masculine given names